A self-contained breathing apparatus (SCBA), sometimes referred to as a compressed air breathing apparatus (CABA) or simply breathing apparatus (BA), is a device worn to provide breathable air in an atmosphere that is immediately dangerous to life or health. They are typically used in firefighting and industry. The term self-contained means that the SCBA is not dependent on a remote supply of breathing gas (e.g., through a long hose). If designed for use under water, it is also known as a Scuba set (self-contained underwater breathing apparatus). When not used underwater, they are sometimes called industrial breathing sets. Unofficial names include air pack, air tank, oxygen cylinder or simply pack, which are mostly used in firefighting.

An SCBA typically has three main components: a high-pressure tank (e.g., about 150 to 374 atmospheres), a pressure regulator, and an inhalation connection (mouthpiece, mouth mask or face mask), connected together and mounted to a carrying frame.

A self-contained breathing apparatus may fall into one of two categories: open-circuit or closed-circuit.

Types

Closed-circuit 

The closed-circuit type, also known as a rebreather, operates by filtering, supplementing, and recirculating exhaled gas. It is used when a longer-duration supply of breathing gas is needed, such as in mine rescue and in long tunnels, and going through passages too narrow for a big open-circuit air cylinder. Before open-circuit SCBA's were developed, most industrial breathing sets were rebreathers, such as the Siebe Gorman Proto, Siebe Gorman Savox, or Siebe Gorman Salvus. An example of modern rebreather SCBAs would be the SEFA.

Open-circuit 

Open-circuit industrial breathing sets are filled with filtered, compressed air, rather than pure oxygen. Typical open-circuit systems have two regulators; a first stage to reduce the pressure of air to allow it to be carried to the mask, and a second stage regulator to reduce it even further to a level just above standard atmospheric pressure. This air is then fed to the mask via either a demand valve (activating only on inhalation) or a continuous positive pressure valve (providing constant airflow to the mask).  

An open-circuit rescue or firefighter SCBA has a fullface mask, regulator, air cylinder, cylinder pressure gauge, remote pressure gauge (sometimes with an integrated PASS device), and a harness with adjustable shoulder straps and waist belt which lets it be worn on the back. The air cylinder usually comes in one of three standard sizes: 4 liter, 6 liter, or 6.8 liter. The duration of the cylinder can be calculated with this formula: volume (in liters) × pressure (in bars) / 40 - 10 in minutes (the 10 is subtracted to provide a safety margin), so a 6-liter cylinder, of 300 bar, is 6 × 300 / 40 - 10 = 35 minutes working duration. The relative fitness, and especially the level of exertion of the wearer, often results in variations of the actual usable time that the SCBA can provide air, often reducing the working time by 25% to 50%.

Air cylinders are made of aluminium, steel, or of a composite construction (usually carbon-fiber wrapped.) The composite cylinders are the lightest in weight and are therefore preferred by fire departments (UK: fire and rescue services previously called fire brigades), but they also have the shortest lifespan and must be taken out of service after 15 years. Air cylinders must be hydrostatically tested every 5 years. During extended operations, empty air cylinders can be quickly replaced with fresh ones and then refilled from larger tanks in a cascade storage system or from an air compressor brought to the scene.

Positive versus negative pressure
Open circuit SCBAs use either "positive pressure" or "negative pressure" operation. 

A negative pressure system relies on the internal pressure of the mask dropping to below the ambient pressure to activate flow. if the mask does not seal perfectly, some leakage of ambient gas into the mask will occur, which can be a problem with toxic or irritant smoke and fumes. 

A positive pressure system slightly pressurises the interior of the mask and activates flow when the pressure difference is reduced, but still above ambient. If the mask leaks, there will be continuous flow to maintain the pressure, and no inward leakage is possible. With a good fit this is economical on gas and prevents contamination. If the mask falls off the regulator will continuously expend gas trying to raise the pressure, and may consume a significant amount of gas before it is corrected.

Although the performance of both types of SCBA may be similar under optimum conditions, this "fail safe" behaviour makes a positive pressure SCBA preferable for most applications. As there is usually no air usage penalty in providing positive pressure, the older negative pressure type is, in most cases, an obsolete configuration and is only seen with older equipment. However some users refuse to use this technology as in case of a damage or loss of the facepiece the air will be released uncontrolled. The leakage rate can be so high that a fully charged SCBA will be drained in less than three minutes, a problem that does not happen with negative pressure SCBA systems.

Masks

The fullface masks of breathing apparatus designed for use out of water are sometimes designed in a way that makes them unsuitable for scuba diving, although some may allow very shallow emergency submersion:
 The seal at the edge of the mask is a wide tube with thin, flexible walls running around the edge of the mask, full of air at atmospheric pressure. On the surface it pushes against the edges of the wearer's face, causing a tight seal despite small variations in head shape. At more than a few feet depth pressure (underwater or in a caisson) this tube collapses, destroying the seal and making the mask leak.
 Curved window which underwater would severely distort the image by refraction.

The mask can have a large viewport, or small eye lenses.

The mask might have a small orinasal breathing mask inside, reducing breathing deadspace.

The mask can also incorporate a two-way radio communicator.

Some early industrial rebreathers (e.g., the Siebe Gorman Proto) had a mouthpiece and attached noseclip instead of a mask.

Usage

There are two major application areas for SCBA: firefighting and industrial use. A third use now coming into practice is medical; for example, the American National Institutes of Health prescribe use of SCBAs for medical staff during treatment of ebola.

For firefighting, the design emphasis is on heat and flame resistance above cost. SCBAs designed for firefighting tend to be expensive because of the exotic materials used to provide the flame resistance, and to a lesser extent, to reduce the weight penalty on the firefighter. In addition, modern firefighting SCBAs incorporate a PASS device (personal alert safety system) or an ADSU (automatic distress signal unit) into their design. These units emit distinctive, high-pitched alarm tones to help locate firefighters in distress by automatically activating if movement is not sensed for a certain length of time (typically between 15 and 30 seconds), also allowing for manual activation should the need arise. In firefighting use, the layout of this breathing set should not interfere with ability to carry a rescued person over the firefighter's shoulders.

The other major application is for industrial users of various types. Historically, mining was an important area, and in Europe this is still reflected by limitations on use in the construction of SCBAs of metals that can cause sparks. Other important users are petrochemical, chemical, and nuclear industries. The design emphasis for industrial users depends on the precise application and extends from the bottom end which is cost critical, to the most severe environments where the SCBA is one part of an integrated protective environment which includes gas-tight suits for whole-body protection and ease of decontamination. Industrial users will often be supplied with air via an air line, and only carry compressed air for escape or decontamination purposes.

Temperature effect on pressure 
The pressure gauge's indicated gas pressure changes with ambient temperature. As temperature decreases, the pressure inside the cylinder decreases. The relationship between the temperature and the pressure of a gas is defined by the formula PV = nRT. (See Universal gas constant.) What is particularly important to understand from the formula is that the temperature is in Kelvins, not degrees Fahrenheit. Consider the freezing point of water at 32° F (0° C, 273.15° K) and compare it to 96° F (35.6° C or 308.71° K; normal human body temperature is 37° C). While 96 is arithmetically three times 32, the difference in temperature from a scientific point of view is not threefold. Instead of comparing 32° F to 96° F, temperatures of 273.15° K and 308.71° K should be compared. If an air cylinder is pressurized to 4,500 psi at 96° F and later the temperature drops to 32° F, the pressure gauge will indicate 4,000 psi (4,500/1.13). Stated differently, a drop in temperature of 10° F (5.5° C) causes a pressure decrease of about 82 psi (565 kPa). Failure to accurately account for the effect of temperature on pressure readings can result in underfilled air cylinders, which in turn could lead to a firefighter running out of air prematurely.

Regulation

In the United States and Canada, SCBAs used in firefighting must meet guidelines established by the National Fire Protection Association, NFPA Standard 1981. If an SCBA is labeled as "1981 NFPA compliant", it is designed for firefighting. The current version of the standard was published in 2018. These standards are revised every five years. Similarly, the National Institute for Occupational Safety and Health (NIOSH) has a certification program for SCBA that are intended to be used in chemical, biological, radiological, and nuclear (CBRN) environments. 

Any SCBA supplied for use in Europe must comply with the requirements of the Personal Protective Equipment Directive (89/686/EEC). In practice this usually means that the SCBA must comply with the requirements of the European Standard EN 137:2006. This includes detailed requirements for the performance of the SCBA, the marking required, and the information to be provided to the user. Two classes of SCBA are recognised, Type 1 for industrial use and Type 2 for firefighting. Any SCBA conforming to this standard will have been verified to reliably operate and protect the user from -30 °C to +60 °C under a wide range of severe simulated operational conditions.

The Royal Australian Navy uses the open circuit compressed air breathing apparatus (OCCABA), a backpack-style, positive pressure breathing apparatus, for firefighting roles.

See also

}

Notes

References

External links

 These references are related to NIOSH-certified SCBA with chemical, biological, radiological, and nuclear (CBRN) protection (SC/PD/CBRN):
 CBRN SCBA interim user guide and list of approved CBRN SCBA
 CBRN SCBA standard development and publication leading to the first NIOSH-Certified SCBA with CBRN protection offered by the US DHHS/CDC/NIOSH/NPPTL on June 3, 2002
 Image of 2-cylinder open-circuit SCBA
Rescuer Deaths in Underground Mines
 Literature
Study of the physiological effects of wearing breathing apparatus  by RG Love and others. Institute of Occupational Medicine Research Report TM/94/05

Firefighting equipment
Industrial breathing sets
Pressure vessels
Breathing gases
Functional masks
Respirators